All nationalities traveling to Samoa can enter visa free. All visitors must hold a passport valid for 6 months. All visitors must have a return or onward ticket, copy of a bank statement, no record of deportation from other countries, no health problems that would pose a risk to Samoa, no history of criminal charges.

Visa policy map

Visa-free stay
Visitors in general are allowed to remain in the country for 60 days unless there is a separate agreement with different provisions.

Visa-free agreements 
: Samoa signed a mutual visa-waiver agreement with the European Union on 28 May 2015 which was ratified on 15 December 2015. This agreement allows all citizens of states that are contracting parties to the Schengen Agreement to stay without a visa for a maximum period of 90 days within any 180 day period.
: Samoa signed a mutual visa-waiver agreement with the Russia on 4 April 2017 which entered into force on 9 July 2017. This agreement allows citizens of Russia to stay without a visa for a period of 60 days.
: Samoa signed a mutual visa-waiver agreement with Macau in 2000. This agreement allows Chinese citizens of Macau to stay without a visa for a period of 30 days.
: A visa waiver agreement was signed with Israel in March 2019 and it is yet to be implemented.

See also

Visa requirements for Samoan citizens

References

Foreign relations of Samoa
Government of Samoa
Samoa